The German American School of Portland, Oregon, offers a dual language program in German and English for preschool to 5th grade. It is one of the six schools in the United States accredited by the Federal Republic of Germany's Zentralstelle für das Auslandsschulwesen, Federal Office of Administration. 170 students from 25 nations attend school each day. The school offers full day and half day options for preschool, before-school care, extended care, after school programs, and music lessons on site. It is located at 3900 SW Murray Blvd., Beaverton, Oregon.

Preschoolers and kindergartners are introduced to the German language as a part of creative and playful activities, so that they are comfortable with bilingual instruction as they enter the first grade. Classes are also offered for adults. Upon completion of the fifth grade, students are eligible to attend a partner school, Gilkey International Middle School, of the French American International School, which offers German-language instruction in language arts and social studies.

On Saturdays, the school rents out its facility to a German Immersion Saturday school that is named for Sophie Scholl, a young woman who resisted the Nazis.

In 2006, the 4th, 5th, and 6th graders of the German American School were among 100 winning schools in a poetry contest, and were awarded a free trip to Europe their German poems about soccer.

In 2011, the German-American School opened its SolarLab and solar panel displays to the public.

See also 
German language in the United States
 Bonn International School, an Anglo-American school in Bonn formed by the merger of two American schools and one British school
 German American

References

External links
 German American School Portland

Schools in Portland, Oregon
German-American culture in Portland, Oregon
German-language schools
Bilingual schools in the United States
International schools in Oregon
German international schools in the United States